Iñaki Isasi Flores (born April 20, 1977, in Respaldiza, in Álava) is a former Spanish racing cyclist who competed professionally for the  team throughout his career. Isasi turned professional in 2001 and did not record a major result of note as a professional.

Major results
2001
 8th Overall Tour de l'Avenir
2003
 6th GP Villafranca de Ordizia
2004
 7th Overall Escalada a Montjuïc
2006
 3rd Trofeo Calvià
 4th Overall Vuelta a Andalucía
2011
 9th Tour de Vendée

Grand Tour general classification results timeline

References

External links
 Rider profile

Cyclists from the Basque Country (autonomous community)
Spanish male cyclists
1977 births
Living people
Sportspeople from Álava